Webb v. O'Brien, was a case in which the Supreme Court of the United States upheld a ban on cropping contracts, which technically dealt with labor rather than land and were used by many Issei to avoid the restrictions of California's alien land act. It overturned a lower court decision.

See also 
 List of United States Supreme Court immigration case law

References

United States Supreme Court cases
1923 in United States case law